Samoana fragilis is a species of tropical, air-breathing land snail, a terrestrial, pulmonate, gastropod mollusk in the family Partulidae. This species is known by the common name Fragile Tree snail and endemic to Guam and island Rota.

References

F
Fauna of Guam
Fauna of the Northern Mariana Islands
Molluscs of Oceania
Critically endangered fauna of Oceania
Critically endangered fauna of the United States